Eupithecia behrensata is a moth in the family Geometridae first described by Alpheus Spring Packard in 1876. It is found in North America from California north to British Columbia, Alberta and Saskatchewan.

Adults are large and grey brown. Adults have been recorded on wing from March to August.

References

behrensata
Moths of North America
Fauna of the Sierra Nevada (United States)
Moths described in 1876